Christopher Nelson may refer to:
Christopher Nelson (field hockey), player in 2005 Men's EuroHockey Nations Championship squads
Christopher Nelson (make-up artist), American makeup artist
Christopher Nelson (police officer), Indian Police Service officer

See also
Chris Nelson (disambiguation)